Palmarejo is a rural barrio with an urban zone in the municipality of Corozal, Puerto Rico. Its population in 2010 was 6,068.

Features and demographics
Palmarejo has  of land area and no water area.

History
Puerto Rico was ceded by Spain in the aftermath of the Spanish–American War under the terms of the Treaty of Paris of 1898 and became an unincorporated territory of the United States. In 1899, the United States Department of War conducted a census of Puerto Rico finding that the population of Palmarejo barrio was 901.

Sectors
Barrios (which are like minor civil divisions) in turn are further subdivided into smaller local populated place areas/units called sectores (sectors in English). The types of sectores may vary, from normally sector to urbanización to reparto to barriada to residencial, among others.

The following sectors are in Palmarejo barrio:

Mavilla Bridge

A bridge listed on the National Register of Historic Places in Puerto Rico is between Palmarejo barrio and Abras barrio, also in Corozal.

Features
PR-164 is the main east-west road through Palmarejo.

See also

 List of communities in Puerto Rico
 List of barrios and sectors of Corozal, Puerto Rico

References

External links
 
 

Barrios of Corozal, Puerto Rico